Nicole Pollard is a fashion stylist and entrepreneur living in Santa Monica. She is the CEO and Founder of LaLaLuxe, Bikini Cleanse, and the co-founder of Closet et Cie.

Personal
Nicole was born and raised in Santa Monica, CA. She attended Malibu High School where she earned a spot on the Men’s Water Polo Team, and then attended San Diego State University. After college, Nicole took a position at Paramount Studios in the art department.

In 2013, Pollard married Ari Lee Bayme, a Merchant Banker from New York, and the couple now live in the Mandeville Canyon section of Los Angeles. In 2016, Pollard gave birth to a son, Morris Thursby Bayme, and in 2018 she gave birth to a girl, Phoenix Rose Bayme. In 2019, Nicole and her husband settled a medical malpractice lawsuit against Cedars Sinai Hospital and Dr. Jay M. Goldberg over the death of Morris Thursby Bayme.

Career

In 2005 Nicole started LaLaLuxe, a styling firm in Los Angeles focused on the high net worth individuals. Pollard and her team provide clients with fashion styling services, as well as sourcing fashion accessories such as Hermes handbags, and jewelry pieces.

In 2013, Nicole was named LA’s best personal stylists by CBS Los Angeles.

Nicole is well known for her work with international clients, both when they visit Los Angeles, as well as in their home countries.

Nicole founded Bikini Cleanse in 2014, "an all-natural, 7-day cleanse system". Pollard invented Bikini Cleanse based on her experiences trying to lose weight before a beach vacation in Maui.

After surgery for a thyroid issue in 2018, Nicole began to shift the focus of Bikini Cleanse towards wellness products and intimate care, in addition to weight loss. The first Bikini Cleanse product launched under this initiative was the Bikini Cleanse Beauty Tea.

References 

Fashion stylists
Living people
Year of birth missing (living people)